Robert James du Preez (born 30 July 1993, in Durban) is a South African professional rugby union player for English Premiership side . His regular position is fly-half.

Career

Early career

He played for the  side in 2011 and 2012. In the 2012 competition, Du Preez was the top points scorer in the competition scoring seven tries, thirty conversions and fifteen penalties for a total of 140 points.

In 2013, Du Preez was included in the South Africa Under-20 squad for the 2013 IRB Junior World Championship. He started the pool matches against the United States (kicking six conversions) and England (scoring two conversions and four penalties). He was an unused substitute in their final pool match against hosts France, but returned to the starting line-up for their semi-final match against Wales and came on as a substitute in the third-placed play-off against New Zealand.

Upon his return to domestic action, he weighed in with 108 points for the  side during the 2013 Under-21 Provincial Championship competition to finish third in the top scorers list.

In 2014, he moved to Stellenbosch to join  on loan for their 2014 Varsity Cup campaign. He once again topped the scoring charts, scoring 84 points during Maties' run to the semi-final of the competition. He was also named the "Player that Rocks" for the tournament.

Instead of returning to Durban at the conclusion of the 2014 Varsity Cup, Du Preez decided to remain in the Western Cape, signing a contract with  until 2016.

2018 season

Du Preez moved from the Stormers to the Sharks for the 2018 Super Rugby season to join his family. He had a breakout season in 2018, becoming a regular starter for his new team almost immediately, displacing Curwin Bosch from his place at fly-half, causing Bosch to move to fullback.

He was named by the new South African head coach Rassie Erasmus as one of 17 uncapped players in the 43–man Springbok squad for the 2018 June internationals. Du Preez's two younger brothers were also named in the squad, with Robert, Jean-Luc and Dan Du Preez making history as the first set of three siblings to be named in a Springbok squad together.

Personal

Du Preez's father – also called Robert – is a former Springbok scrum-half that made seven appearances for South Africa between 1992 and 1993.

He also has two younger twin brothers – Dan and Jean-Luc – that were both included in the South Africa Under-20 squad for the 2014 IRB Junior World Championship. Du Preez's younger brothers are currently his teammates in the Sharks.

He attended Catholic University school in 2009 on an exchange programme.

References

1993 births
Living people
Afrikaner people
Barbarian F.C. players
Rugby union fly-halves
Rugby union players from Durban
South Africa international rugby union players
South Africa Under-20 international rugby union players
South African rugby union players
Western Province (rugby union) players
Alumni of Kearsney College
Expatriate rugby union players in England
South African expatriate sportspeople in England
South African expatriate rugby union players